TBY may refer to:

TBY, the IATA code for Tshabong Airport, Tsabong, Botswana
TBY, the National Rail code for Thornaby railway station, North Yorkshire, England